Albrightsville is an unincorporated community and census-designated place which is located in Kidder and Penn Forest townships, Carbon County, Pennsylvania, United States. It is part of Northeastern Pennsylvania.

Demographics and geography
As of the 2020 census, the population was 138.

It is drained by Mud Run (which forms the township boundary) westward into the Lehigh River. Pennsylvania Routes 534 and 903 intersect at the eastern corner of the village. Although it has its own post office with the ZIP code of 18210, areas just to the north and west use the Lake Harmony ZIP code of 18624.

The Holiday Pocono community is directly to the north, across Pennsylvania 534, and Towamensing Trails is directly across Pennsylvania 903 to the southeast. The community is just east of Hickory Run State Park.

The community has a warm-summer humid continental climate (Dfb) and the average monthly temperature ranges from 23.5° F in January to 68.5° F in July. The hardiness zone is 5b and the average annual absolute minimum temperature is -13.4° F.

References

Populated places in Carbon County, Pennsylvania